U. S. Grant High School is a high school in south Oklahoma City, Oklahoma.

Notable alumni

Jim Bolding, world record holder in the 440-yard hurdles (class of 1968)

References

External links
 U S Grant High School
 Oklahoma City Public Schools

Public high schools in Oklahoma
Educational institutions established in 1953
Schools in Oklahoma City
1953 establishments in Oklahoma